The Sedbergh Hills Fell Race is an annual fell running race in Cumbria, England. The race starts and finishes in Sedbergh and has a distance of approximately 22.5km and contains 1830m of ascent. It is usually run in August.  The inaugural event was held in 1979. The ladies' race was held over a shorter course that year, but subsequently the women ran the same route as the men. In its early years, the race was organised by Mike Walford on behalf of Kendal Athletic Club.

Course
From Sedbergh the course makes a clockwise loop. It initially heads up to Arant Haw (605m) and then to Castley Knotts. Then around Brown Moor, Fell Head and Hazelgill Knott. The course turns south to The Calf (676m) past Arant Haw again to Winder (473m) before heading down into Sedbergh.

Winners

Note 1: The women ran a shorter course than the men in 1979.

References

Fell running competitions in Cumbria
Sedbergh